is a passenger railway station located in the city of Takamatsu, Kagawa, Japan.  It is operated by the private transportation company Takamatsu-Kotohira Electric Railroad (Kotoden) and is designated station "S10".

Lines
Ōmachi Station is a station of the Kotoden Shido Line and is located 8.7 km from the opposing terminus of the line at Kawaramachi Station].

Layout
The station consists of two opposed side platforms connected by a level crossing. The station is unattended.

Adjacent stations

History
Ōmachi Station opened on November 18, 1911 on the Tosan Electric Tramway. It became a station of the Sanuki Electric Railway in 1942. On November 1, 1943 it became a station on the Takamatsu-Kotohira Electric Railway. Operations were suspended on January 26, 1945 from Yakuri Station to this station, but were reopened on October 9, 1949.

Passenger statistics

Surrounding area
Takamatsu City Mure Elementary School
Takamatsu City Mure Junior High School
Japan National Route 11

See also
 List of railway stations in Japan

References

External links

  

Railway stations in Japan opened in 1911
Railway stations in Takamatsu